Interbellum Generation is a social generational term that is sometimes used to describe people born in the United States during the early 20th century, often specified as the years 1901 to 1914, who were born on the cusp of the Lost Generation and Greatest Generation.

Characteristics
The name "Interbellum" (derived from the Latin inter "between" and bellum "war") comes from the fact that those born during this time were too young to have served in the military during World War I, and were generally too old to serve as enlisted personnel in World War II. Although many of them joined the armed forces in the latter conflict, they were however more likely to have served behind the frontlines. Therefore, the Interbellum Generation was sandwiched between the Lost Generation and the Greatest Generation.

Members of this generation came of age either during the Roaring Twenties or the initial phase of the Great Depression, prior to the election of Franklin D. Roosevelt and the promulgation of the New Deal. This fact contributed to the core of this generation holding lifelong left-liberal views in politics, especially on economic issues (many of them joined Communist fronts during the 1930s), although with a few prominent dissenters such as Barry Goldwater. Most of their children belong to the Silent Generation, the majority of their grandchildren are late Boomers, and their great-grandchildren are mostly Millennials.

Notable figures
Richard Arvin Overton (born in 1906), the oldest living World War II veteran, was a member of this generation.

The four Presidents of the United States of the Interbellum Generation were Lyndon B. Johnson (born in 1908), Ronald Reagan (born in 1911), Richard Nixon, and Gerald Ford (both born in 1913). However, all four served in World War II with younger members of the Greatest Generation.

Two Prime Ministers of the United Kingdom were also members of the Interbellum Generation, Alec Douglas-Home (born in 1903) and James Callaghan (born in 1912). Like their US counterparts, they also served alongside later Greatest Generation members in World War II.

References

20th century
2000s neologisms
Cultural generations
Interwar period